Katrin Elisabeth Nabholz (born 3 April 1986 in Basel, Switzerland) is a Swiss ice hockey forward.

International career
Nabholz was selected for the Switzerland national women's ice hockey team in the 2010 Winter Olympics. She played in all five games, though she did not score a point.

Nabholz has also appeared for Switzerland at seven IIHF Women's World Championships at two levels. Her first appearance came in 2005. She was a member of the bronze medal winning team at the 2012 championships.

Career statistics

International career

References

External links
Eurohockey.com Profile
Sports-Reference Profile

1986 births
Living people
Ice hockey players at the 2010 Winter Olympics
Ice hockey players at the 2014 Winter Olympics
Medalists at the 2014 Winter Olympics
Olympic bronze medalists for Switzerland
Olympic ice hockey players of Switzerland
Olympic medalists in ice hockey
Sportspeople from Basel-Stadt
Swiss women's ice hockey forwards
21st-century Swiss women